Colonel Robert Patterson (1753–1827) was an American soldier and settler who helped found the cities of Lexington, Kentucky, and Cincinnati, Ohio, then moved to Dayton, Ohio.

Early life 
Born in Pennsylvania, Patterson emigrated to Kentucky in 1775. He served in the Kentucky militia in the western theater of the American Revolutionary War. He took part in George Rogers Clark's celebrated Illinois campaign in 1778, and fought in many other actions during the war. He was a captain of the Fayette County militia in the Battle of Blue Licks, the last major battle of the war in the west. He was, along with Daniel Boone, one of the few senior officers to survive that disastrous battle.

In 1786 he was severely injured in Logan's Raid in the Northwest Indian War. Patterson moved north from Kentucky into the Northwest Territory in 1788, and was one of the three founders of Cincinnati, a river port along the north side of the Ohio River across from  Kentucky.

Later life 
Patterson then moved to Dayton, Ohio, in 1802 and continued his military service as a quartermaster during the War of 1812. Patterson's farm, Rubicon, was located two miles south of Dayton where he and his wife Elizabeth (Lindsay) raised eight children. Their land is currently part of the University of Dayton and stretched from there west to the Old soldiers' home (presently the Dayton VA Medical Center).

Personal life 
One of Patterson's grandchildren, John H. Patterson, became a prominent Dayton citizen and founded the National Cash Register Company (now NCR Corporation) in 1884.

Patterson's granddaughter Eliza Jane (Brown) Anderson was the First Lady of Ohio 1865-1866.  Her husband was Governor Charles Anderson.

Legacy 
Patterson's home, known as the Patterson Homestead, is now a historic house museum operated by Dayton History.

Sources
Ohio Historical Society. "Robert Patterson" in Ohio History Central: An Online Encyclopedia of Ohio History, 2005.
State Library of Ohio. "Patterson Family Papers". 
Entry from the New International Encyclopedia
Hammon, Neal O. Daniel Boone and the Defeat at Blue Licks. Minneapolis: The Boone Society, 2005.

Primary sources
 Brown-Patterson Papers (MS-015). Dayton Metro Library, Dayton, Ohio. 
 Patterson Family Papers (MS-236). Wright State University Special Collections and Archives, Dayton, Ohio.

External links

1753 births
1827 deaths
American people of the Northwest Indian War
American militiamen in the War of 1812
History of Cincinnati
Kentucky militiamen in the American Revolution
People from Dayton, Ohio